Warren Foegele (born April 1, 1996) is a Canadian professional ice hockey forward who currently plays  with the Edmonton Oilers in the National Hockey League (NHL). He was drafted by the Carolina Hurricanes in the third-round, 67th overall, at the 2014 NHL Entry Draft.

Playing career

Amateur
Foegele played at St. Andrew’s College from 2011-2014, and served as an alternate captain starting in 2013. He was named a CISAA All-Star and team MVP after he helped lead St. Andrew’s College to a CISAA Championship.

Despite accepting his scholarship invitation to the University of New Hampshire, Foegele was selected by the Kingston Frontenacs in the 7th round of the 2014 OHL Draft. He ended up joining the Frontenacs while in his second year at New Hampshire, forgoing his collegiate career.

On January 2, 2017, Foegele was traded by the Frontenacs to the Erie Otters in exchange for Brett Neumann. Nearing the end of the 2016–17 season, Foegele agreed to an entry level contract with the Carolina Hurricanes who had drafted him in the 2014 NHL Entry Draft on March 31, 2017. At the end of the 2016–17 playoffs, Foegele was awarded the Wayne Gretzky 99 Award as the MVP of the 2017 playoffs.

Professional

Carolina Hurricanes
Foegele started the 2017–18 season with the Hurricanes' AHL affiliate the Charlotte Checkers. Foegele was named to the AHL All-Star Game after he led all rookies in goals and was tied for third in the league. Foegele was suspended for one game on March 19, 2018, for boarding during a game against the Binghamton Devils. He was called up to the NHL for the first time on March 25, 2018. Foegele played in his first NHL game the following day against the Ottawa Senators. He scored his first NHL goal and recorded his first NHL assist in his debut to help the Hurricanes win 4–1. He was sent back to the AHL after playing in two games and recording three points. Foegele was named the Checkers' Rookie of the Year following the team's elimination from the 2018 Calder Cup playoffs.

After participating at the Hurricanes training camp, Foegele started the 2018–19 season with the Hurricanes in the NHL. Foegele began the season as a winger to Jordan Staal and Justin Williams, collecting five points in the Hurricanes first seven games. However, he experienced a 27-game scoring drought following October 9, which was snapped in a 3–0 win over the Arizona Coyotes on December 16. The Hurricanes would qualify for the 2019 Stanley Cup playoffs and played their first round series against the Washington Capitals. On April 18, Foegele set a new franchise record for fastest postseason goal at 17 seconds. The Hurricanes would win the game 2–1 to tie the series.   On May 3, 2019, Foegele scored an assist and tied Erik Cole’s 2002 record for most points by a Hurricanes/Hartford Whalers rookie in a postseason.

After his successful rookie season,  Foegele again made the Hurricanes lineup for the 2019–20 NHL season. In a  4-0 win over the Calgary Flames on December 14, he became the fifth player in Hurricanes/Hartford Whalers history to record two shorthanded goals in a game. He ended the shortened season with a new career high in goals, assists and points, ranked tied for fifth in the league in shorthanded goals. As an unrestricted free agent, Foegele signed a one year $2.15 million contract to remained with the Hurricanes for the  season on November 1, 2020.

Edmonton Oilers
As an impending restricted free agent with the Hurricanes and unable to agree to terms, Foegele was traded to the Edmonton Oilers in exchange for Ethan Bear on July 28, 2021. He was quickly signed by the Oilers in finalizing a three-year, $2.75 million average annual value, total $8.25 million contract extension on July 31.

Personal life
Foegele was born to George and Leslie Foegele and grew up in Markham, Ontario with his older brother Reese. Reese was also an athlete; he previously played junior hockey and later lacrosse at Wilfrid Laurier University.

Career statistics

Awards and honours

References

External links

1996 births
Living people
Canadian ice hockey left wingers
Carolina Hurricanes draft picks
Carolina Hurricanes players
Charlotte Checkers (2010–) players
Edmonton Oilers players
Erie Otters players
Ice hockey people from Ontario
Kingston Frontenacs players
New Hampshire Wildcats men's ice hockey players
Sportspeople from Markham, Ontario